Uncle Monty may refer to: 
  
 Montgomery Montgomery, better known as Uncle Monty in A Series of Unfortunate Events   
 Montague H. Withnail, Uncle Monty in the 1987 film Withnail and I   
 Myint Thein, known as Uncle Monty, a Burmese activist